The Rutles 2: Can't Buy Me Lunch is a re-telling of the 1978 mockumentary All You Need Is Cash, in a modern setting. It was premiered at the Don't Knock the Rock film festival in 2003.

Plot 
Twenty-four years after the original, documentarist Melvin Hall (Eric Idle) interviews musicians, actors, and other entertainment figures about the days of the popular band The Rutles.

Cast

Background 
In the interviews with David Bowie, he is seen holding a copy of the vinyl album The Rutles 1, calling it a "piece of marketing extravagance." The interview in the film shows the cover of the album with a black circle that has the words "27 No. 1 Songs on One LP". In the DVD extras, the circle on the album cover says "27 No. 1 Songs on 1 CD", even though this is a vinyl record album. Either way, this was the only time that a Rutles album was practically identical to a Beatles album in both album cover and title.

Reception 
The Rutles 2: Can't Buy Me Lunch received mainly negative reviews, with many complaining that it was simply an update for modern audiences. Idle didn't ask for the participation of Fataar, Halsey or Innes for the making of the film, viewing it as a solo project. It contained no new interviews with the Rutles; Rutle footage consisted of outtakes and unused film produced for the original 1978 mockumentary. Idle did new interviews with Hanks, Raitt, Williams, Shandling and Rushdie. Though he had declined to participate in the 1996 release of Archaeology, Idle used songs from the album in the film.

References

External links 

British mockumentary films
British rock music films
Pop music films
2002 television films
2002 films
The Beatles in film
Films with screenplays by Eric Idle
Films à clef
2000s British films
British comedy television films